Tata Institute of Fundamental Research Hyderabad (or TIFR HYD) is a public research institution in Hyderabad, India. Then Prime Minister of India Manmohan Singh laid the foundation stone for the institute on 19 October 2010. It has operated on a campus of  near the Hyderabad Central University since moving in October 2017 from a temporary campus in Narsingi.

The TIFR Centre for Interdisciplinary Sciences (TCIS) is the first centre of TIFR Hyderabad. The faculty are drawn from all the three major branches of the natural sciences and engineering. Nearly a hundred graduate students, postdoctoral fellows and scientific staff already work here on research topics from the life sciences, chemistry, physics and materials sciences. Substantial experimental efforts have commenced using tools of Nuclear Magnetic Resonance (NMR), Laser Sciences, Condensed Matter Physics, Synthetic and Biological Chemistry, Cell and Developmental Biology. TIFR Hyderabad has a department-less structure.

Research areas 

 Biological Physics and Mechanobiology
 Biophysical Chemistry and Molecular Biophysics
  Cell and  Cancer Biology
 Computational Chemistry and  Physics 
 Fluid Dynamics
 Fluorescence Spectroscopy and Microscopy
 Laser Physics
 Materials Science
 Molecular Genetics
 Molecular Immunology and Cell Signaling
 NMR Spectroscopy
 Soft Matter
  Synthetic Chemistry
 Theoretical Chemistry and  Physics

References

Tata Institute of Fundamental Research
Universities and colleges in Hyderabad, India
Research institutes in Hyderabad, India
2010 establishments in Andhra Pradesh
Research institutes established in 2010